Meds may refer to: 

 Medications, drugs to treat or prevent diseases
 Meds (album), by the rock band Placebo
 "Meds" (song), the title track of that album
 The Med people of South Asia